Barbara Leibssle-Balogh (born 22 October 1985 in Budapest) is a retired Hungarian handballer.

She started to play handball at the age of seven, and three years later, in 1995, she was signed by Vasas SC. She spent her youth years there, and made her senior debut in 2002. She moved to Dunaferr SE in 2004, where beside playing handball she also studied on the College of Dunaújváros. She signed to Ferencváros in early 2009.

Balogh made her international debut on 14 October 2008 against France. She participated on the European Championship yet in that year, however, up to the present it remained the only major international tournament she was picked for.

Achievements
Nemzeti Bajnokság I:
Silver Medallist: 2005, 2008, 2009
Bronze Medallist: 2006, 2007, 2011
Magyar Kupa:
Silver Medallist: 2005, 2010
Bronze Medallist: 2007
EHF Champions League:
Semifinalist: 2005
EHF Cup:
Semifinalist: 2008
EHF Cup Winners' Cup:
Winner: 2011
Youth European Championship:
Bronze Medallist: 2003
World University Championship:
Winner: 2010

Personal life 

She is married to German handball coach, Mike Leibssle.

References

External links
 Barbara Balogh career statistics at Worldhandball

1985 births
Living people
Hungarian female handball players
Handball players from Budapest
Expatriate handball players
Hungarian expatriate sportspeople in Germany
20th-century Hungarian women
21st-century Hungarian women